The following highways are numbered 450:

Canada
Manitoba Provincial Road 450
New Brunswick Route 450
Newfoundland and Labrador Route 450

Japan
 Route 450 (Japan)

United States
  U.S. Route 450 (former)
  Florida State Road 450
  Indiana State Road 450
  Iowa Highway 450
  Maryland Route 450
  Mississippi Highway 450
  New Mexico State Road 450
  Ohio State Route 450
  Puerto Rico Highway 450
  Wyoming Highway 450